Parliamentary elections were held in Andorra on 12 and 19 December 1985.
As political parties were not legalised until 1993, all candidates ran as independents. Following the election, Josep Pintat-Solans remained Prime Minister.

Electoral system
All 28 seats of the General Council were up for election. Each parish formed a constituency, electing four members each. Members of the Parliament were elected using a two-round plurality voting system. The voting age was lowered from 21 to 18 years old prior to the elections.

As political parties were not legalised until 1993, all candidates ran as independents, although press and newspapers considered some candidates to be government endorsed (supporting Pintat government) or opponents.

Following the election, the General Council elected the Prime Minister of Andorra and the General Syndic (speaker).

Results
Voter turnout was 80.1%. A second round was held in Sant Julià de Lòria, where one seat remained unfilled as the fourth-place candidate failed to obtain an absolute majority in the first round. For the first time, a woman was elected as a member of the General Council.

By affiliation

References

Andorra
Parliamentary election
Parliamentary elections in Andorra
Non-partisan elections
December 1985 events in Europe
Election and referendum articles with incomplete results